Arnold I may refer to:

Clergy
 Arnold I of Cologne (c. 1100–1151), Archbishop of Cologne 1137–1151
 Arnold I of Vaucourt (c. 1120–1183), Archbishop of Trier 1169–1183
 Arnold I van Isenburg (died c. 1197), Bishop of Utrecht 1196–1197
 Arnold I (bishop of Coria) (died 1197/98), Catholic bishop in Spain
 Arnold I (bishop of Poznań) (died 1211), Catholic bishop in Poland

Nobility
 Arnold I of Astarac (died 960), first Count of Astarac from 926
 Arnold I, Count of Chiny (died 1106), son of Louis II
 Arnold I, Count of Loon (c. 1050–c. 1130), son of Emmo
 Arnold I, Count of Cleves, Count of Cleves 1119–1147
 Arnold I, Count of Laurenburg (died before 1154)
 Arnold I, Lord of Egmond (c. 1337–1409), Lord of Egmond and IJsselstein